Abraham Kumedor (born 25 February 1985 in Kpandu) is a Ghanaian footballer. He currently plays in the Belgian Pro League for Charleroi.

Career 
Kumedor began his career in Heart of Lions, which succeeded in qualifying for CAF Confederation Cup for the first time in its history. In July 2004 he joined Saint-George SA which won the Ethiopian Premier League for two years consecutively. In July 2008 the defensive midfielder joined FK Budućnost Podgorica, a team competing in Montenegrin First League. There he stayed until the end of 2010 before joining Charleroi.

Honours 
Saint George
Ethiopian Premier League (3): 2005, 2006 and 2008
Ethiopian Super Cup (2): 2005 and 2006

References 

Living people
1985 births
Ghanaian footballers
Ghanaian expatriate footballers
Association football midfielders
Heart of Lions F.C. players
Saint George S.C. players
Al-Fateh SC players
Expatriate footballers in Ethiopia
FK Budućnost Podgorica players
Montenegrin First League players
Expatriate footballers in Montenegro
R. Charleroi S.C. players
Belgian Pro League players
Expatriate footballers in Belgium
Expatriate footballers in Saudi Arabia